Here Comes the Groom is an album by folk-rock singer John Wesley Harding, released in 1990. Harding called the backing band the Good Liars. It included Pete Thomas and Bruce Thomas of the Attractions. Not surprisingly, Here Comes the Groom has a feel similar to classic Elvis Costello. Harding's articulate and biting vocal delivery, also reminiscent of Costello, retains a good dark sense of humor.

Critical reception
The Chicago Tribune wrote: "Possessed of an appealing, folky sensibility, Harding takes a musical approach that falls somewhere between folk and rock and manages to be lyrically offbeat enough of the time to make him one of the more interesting new talents around." Trouser Press called the album "a fine modern realization of the same honest singing and playing that typified England’s pub-rock graduates."

Track listing
All songs were written by John Wesley Harding; except as noted
 "Here Comes the Groom"
 "Cathy's New Clown"
 "Spaced Cowgirl"
 "Scared of Guns"
 "You're No Good"
 "When the Sun Comes Up"
 "The Devil in Me"
 "An Audience with You"
 "Dark Dark Heart"
 "Same Thing Twice"
 "Affairs of the Heart"
 "Nothing I'd Rather Do" (Andy White, David Lewis, Harding)
 "Things Snowball" (with Peter Case) (Peter Case, Harding)
 "The Red Rose and the Briar" (David Lewis, Harding)
 "Bastard Son"

Personnel
John Wesley Harding - guitar, vocals
Kirsty MacColl - vocal harmony on "Affairs of the Heart"
Dave Alvin - guitar on "You're No Good"
Geraint Watkins - accordion on "Affairs of the Heart"
Ken Craddock - keyboards
Jeff Lass - keyboards
Bob Loveday - fiddle
Matthew McCauley - vocal harmony
Keith Nelson - banjo on "Same Thing Twice"
Tom Robinson - keyboards on "Bastard Son"
Peter Case - guitar, vocals on "Things Snowball"
Andy Paley - guitar, vocal harmony
Paul Riley - bass
Bruce Thomas - bass
Pete Thomas - drums, percussion
Steve Donnelly - guitar, autoharp
Choir of Julian Dawson - chorus harmony on "Dark Dark Heart"
Dalai Lama Horns - horns

References

John Wesley Harding (singer) albums
1990 albums
Sire Records albums
Albums produced by Andy Paley